Baum–Wallis Farmstead is a historic home and farm located near Johnsonville, Rensselaer County, New York. The farmhouse was built about 1811, and is a one-story, square frame dwelling on a stone foundation.  It has a gable roof with dormer added about 1915. Also on the property are the contributing wagon barn (c. 1900), main barn group (c. 1815, c. 1826, c. 1945), corn crib (c. 1900), ice house / milk house / well house (c. 1900, c. 1946), and pig house / garage (c. 1900, c. 1950-1960).

It was listed on the National Register of Historic Places in 2013.

References

Farms on the National Register of Historic Places in New York (state)
Houses completed in 1811
Buildings and structures in Rensselaer County, New York
National Register of Historic Places in Rensselaer County, New York